Ronald De Witte (born 21 October 1946 in Wilrijk) was a Belgian professional road bicycle racer.

Major results

1969
Brussel - Bever
Mere
Grand Prix de Fourmies
1972
Omloop van West-Brabant
1973
Arendonk
De Panne
1974
Gullegem
Tour de France:
Winner stage 5
1975
Niel
Ruddervoorde
Scheldeprijs Vlaanderen
Zwevegem
Tour de France:
Winner stage 2
1976
Bellegem
Rummen
Paris–Tours
1977
Voerendaal
Putte-Mechelen
Giro d'Italia:
6th place overall classification
1978
Giro d'Italia:
6th place overall classification
1979
Sint-Gillis-Waas
Ottignies

External links 

Belgian male cyclists
1946 births
Living people
Belgian Tour de France stage winners
People from Wilrijk
Cyclists from Antwerp